Toi8 (born October 8, 1976) is a Japanese artist. He is most known for working on various anime such as .hack//The Movie, Maoyuu Maou Yuusha, and several video games where he has served as character designer, including Tokyo Mirage Sessions ♯FE and I Am Setsuna. He is also the illustrator of the My Daughter Left the Nest and Returned an S-Rank Adventurer series of light novels.

Biography 
Toi8 was born in Kumamoto Prefecture, Japan on October 8, 1976. He graduated from Yoyogi Animation College. Although he worked as a hentai illustrator for about two years, he quit his company in about a year. Since he became fascinated with his original drawings, he became a freelance illustrator. He debuted as an illustrator at "Fancy Tokyo Hundred Scenery" published in 2002. His origin of his pen name is from his birthday: October 8. Prior to that, he used the pseudonym "Q8".

References

External links
 
 

1976 births
Japanese illustrators
Japanese animators
Living people
People from Kumamoto Prefecture